Thexder 95 (also called Thexder for Windows 95) is a Windows 95 remake of the first game in the Thexder series, which was originally released for the NEC PC-8801.

It was built with Microsoft's Game SDK (precursor of DirectX).

Gameplay
Thexder can become a tank and jet in this game, and has an enormous number of new weapons, from grenades to thermal bombs.

The game runs in multiple windows: the main view, and several smaller windows each having a different function, e.g., ammo count, map, and actual game, that the gamer could open and close at will during play.

Reception
Computer Games Magazine rated it 2.5/5.

Next Generation reviewed the PC version of the game, rating it two stars out of five, and stated that "The graphics look great for Windows 98. If you run it on the minimum system requirement [...] however, Thexder looks like he's running with magnetic boots on, and the enemies come at you so slowly it's hardly a challenge to pick them off before they get too near. That's OK if you're not good at platform shooters, but your replay value is practically nil."

In 1996, Computer Gaming World declared Thexder the 23rd-worst computer game ever released.

Reviews
PC Games - Dec, 1995
PC Player - Jan, 1996
Computer Games Magazine - Nov 27, 1995

Marketing
This was one of Sierra's showcase games at the launch of Windows 95.

References

External links

1995 video games
Platform games
Single-player video games
Synergistic Software games
Video game remakes
Video games about robots
Video games developed in the United States
Windows games
Windows-only games